Giorgio Mariani (6 April 1946 – 8 December 2011) was an Italian professional footballer who played as a forward or midfielder.

Honours
Fiorentina
 Serie A champion: 1968–69.

References

1946 births
2011 deaths
Italian footballers
Serie A players
Modena F.C. players
Cosenza Calcio 1914 players
Ascoli Calcio 1898 F.C. players
ACF Fiorentina players
Hellas Verona F.C. players
S.S.C. Napoli players
Palermo F.C. players
Inter Milan players
A.C. Cesena players
S.S.D. Varese Calcio players
Association football midfielders